Philippe Souanga (born August 2, 1984 in Marcory, Ivory Coast) is an Ivorian footballer who currently plays for AS Denguele.

References

1984 births
Ivorian footballers
Ivorian expatriates in Morocco
Expatriate footballers in Algeria
Living people
Ivorian expatriates in Algeria
USM Annaba players
Expatriate footballers in Morocco
AS Denguélé players
Footballers from Abidjan
COD Meknès players

Association football forwards